Tom Clegg (1927–1996) was an English actor, who had a number of small roles in film and television during the 1950s, 1960s and 1970s. He is known for appearing in a number of Carry On films, especially Carry On Screaming!, where he played the role of Oddbod.

Born in Leeds, Clegg was a member of the Household Cavalry and a professional boxer before getting into films as a stuntman in films such as Ivanhoe (1952).

His size and tough guy persona led to film roles, including The Flanagan Boy (1953), The Fake (1953), John of the Fair (1954), The Stateless Man (1955), The Extra Day (1956), Moby Dick (1956), The Hideout (1956), Saint Joan (1957), Battle of the V-1 (1958), Mark of the Phoenix (1958), This Sporting Life (1963) and Thunderball (1965).

He was also cast as a number of toughs and henchmen on television, including supporting turns in Quatermass II, Sword of Freedom, The Four Just Men, Dixon of Dock Green, Adam Adamant Lives!, The Saint and The Sweeney.

His appearances in comedy series include Hancock's Half Hour (The Cold, Football Pools, The Big Night and The Two Murderers), The Benny Hill Show, Corrigan Blake, and Till Death Us Do Part. Comedic film roles include Raising the Wind (1961), Decline and Fall... of a Birdwatcher, and Great Catherine (both 1968).

Clegg's comedy roles led him to become a semi-regular in the Carry On films, appearing in Carry On Regardless (1961), Carry On Spying (1964), Carry On Cleo (1964), Carry On Cowboy (1965) and Carry On Loving (1970). In the horror spoof Carry On Screaming (1966), he played the lumbering half-Frankenstein monster, half-werewolf Oddbod.

Filmography

External links

1927 births
1996 deaths
English male film actors
English male television actors
Royal Horse Guards soldiers